Blackout (stylized in capital letters) is the second studio album from American singer and songwriter Steffany Gretzinger. It was released on March 30, 2018, through Bethel Music. Bobby Strand handled the production of the album.

Background
Bethel Music announced that Steffany Gretzinger will be releasing Blackout, her second studio album, would be released on March 30, 2018. This being her second solo studio effort, Blackout follows the issue of her commercially successful and critically acclaimed debut, The Undoing (2014). The album is said to be revealing the "vulnerable, less-visible side," of Steffany Gretzinger. This collection of songs is described as being created for the "in-between moments in life" which mould a person, they convey the idea that even in the chaotic situations of life, "[the] light that shines from the inside out cannot be dimmed." In a press release published on March 9, 2018, Gretzinger spoke of the album's message, saying: 
It's about being able to joyfully dance as tears stream down your face, knowing that life comes through learning to grieve and celebrate at the same time.

Promotion
On March 9, 2018, Bethel Music announced the beginning of the album's pre-order period, with "Save Me" being released as a promotional single as it was availed for instant download and streaming.

Critical reception

The reception of Blackout was largely positive as Gretzinger was lauded by various critics of the CCM and contemporary worship music genres.
Bestowing the album a perfect five stars in a CCM Magazine review, Matt Conner describes the album as a "possessing masterwork," declaring that it is "a career achievement if she decided for some reason to walk away tomorrow. " Anna Hockley, reviewing for Eden.co.uk says that Blackout is "not your average praise and worship CD. It's one that digs a little deeper and at times could be mistaken for something you'd hear in the Top 10 charts – and very much in a good way.
There are times throughout the album where you can hear her emotion and soul speak right to your heart and others where the musical arrangement behind the lyrics really take on a life of their own." Timothy Yap, rated the album three out of five in a Hallels review, asserting that the album "bears the marks of many singer-songwriter albums where it's personal with equal portions of emotions and intelligence," further describing Gretzinger's work as "coterminously ruminative as well as theological." Jesus Freak Hideout critic Josh Balogh awarded Blackout a four star rating, concludes, "with its powerful, engaging vocals, and catchy pop melodies, Blackout is a worshipful, not-to-be-missed album of 2018 sure to please longtime fans of Bethel musicians, and fans of the pop/worship genre." Hayden Royster of LightWorkers praised the album in his review, saying that Blackout is "something truly remarkable: a worship album that encapsulates both the human condition, the glory of God and everything in-between." In a superbly positive review by Kevin Davis of NewReleaseToday, he states "These moving and reverent recordings are poignant songs of adoration. Every song is completely anointed, Spirit-led and emotionally captivating." At Today's Christian Entertainment, Kelly Meade gave the album a rating of three-point-four stars out of five, saying that the album has "intriguing musical arrangements and encouraging lyrics," and that listeners will "find a song that inspires their Christian walk and bring them closer to the Savior."

Accolades

Commercial performance
In the United States, Blackout debuted at No. 2 on Billboard's Christian Albums chart dated April 14, 2018, repeating the feat achieved by Gretzinger's debut album, The Undoing (2014), with 13,000 equivalent album units sold. The release was the best-selling issue on the Independent Albums Chart, the fifth best-selling digital album, and peaked at No. 36 on the Billboard 200 chart.

Track listing

Personnel
Adapter from AllMusic.

 Adam Ayan – mastering
 Jordan Bogart – photography director
 Robby Busick – production manager
 Amanda Cook – piano, vocals
 Jacob Cook – vocals
 Chris Estes – director
 Kathy Frizzell – wurlizter
 Sean Frizzell – vocals
 Chris Greely – mixing
 Steffany Gretzinger – primary artist, vocals
 Brian Johnson – executive producer
 Jerry Kelch – key grip
 Bommy Kwon – editing, video director
 Jeremy Larson – strings
 Daniel Mackenzie – bass
 Mateus Mainhard – sounds
 Taylor Ostrom – art direction, design
 Lucas Sankey – photography
 Bobby Strand – guitar, piano, producer, programming, string arrangements, synthesizer, vocals
 Lindsey Strand – vocals
 Joel Taylor – executive producer
 Joe Volk – drums
 Aly Whitworth – video producer

Charts

Release history

References

External links
 

2018 albums
Steffany Gretzinger albums